The CBR Innovation Network (also Canberra Innovation Network or CBRIN) is an initiative of the government of the Australian Capital Territory, that was founded in 2014, and established to accelerate innovation and diversify the economy in the ACT region. The CBR Innovation Network is based on the collaboration of its six Foundation Members: the Australian National University,   CSIRO, Canberra Institute of Technology, Data61, the University of Canberra, and the University of New South Wales. One of the CBR Innovation Network's primary programs has been the creation of an innovation district in Canberra, which features a business incubator, a start-up accelerator program and a co-working space.

History 
A need for targeted economic development in Canberra was identified by the ACT Government’s Economic Development Directorate in 2014.[2] Canberra Innovation Network was subsequently established in November 2014, with the goal of accelerating innovation and diversifying the ACT region's economy.[1]

Programs 
Canberra Innovation Network supports a range of programs within the ACT, including:

- Coworking, a co-working space for entrepreneurs and startups.[5]

- GRIFFIN Accelerator, a 3-month intensive mentoring and investment program for startups.[7]  Six teams were accepted into the Griffin Accelerator's 2016 program; each team traded a 10% equity stake for funding amounting to $25,000 AUD.[6]

- KILN Incubator, a training and mentorship program for startups[8]

- Innovation Connect Grant, a grant that supports early innovative, entrepreneurial ideas[9]

References

External links 
 CBR Innovation Network at the ACT Government site
Coworking official site
 GRIFFIN Accelerator Program official site
 KILN Incubator official site
Innovation Connect Grand official site

Canberra's universities